Michael Creagh may refer to:
 Sir Michael Creagh (politician), Irish politician and soldier
 Sir Michael O'Moore Creagh, British Army officer 
 Michael Creagh (cricketer), New Zealand cricketer